Tanja Rastetter (born 19 September 1971) is a German former footballer who played as a midfielder. She made six appearances for the Germany national team from 1992 to 1993.

References

External links
 

1971 births
Living people
German women's footballers
Women's association football midfielders
Germany women's international footballers
Footballers from Karlsruhe